Erdi Dikmen (born 6 February 1997) is a Turkish professional footballer who plays as a defender for Altınordu.

Professional career
Dikmen is a product of the youth academy of Samsunspor, and signed his first professional contract with them in 2012. He transferred to Ankara Keçiörengücü and helped them get promoted to the TFF First League. On 27 September 2020, he transferred to Ankaragücü. He made his professional debut with Ankaragücü in a 0–0 Süper Lig tie with Sivasspor on 27 September 2020.

On 17 June 2022, Dikmen signed a two-year contract with Altınordu after playing for the club on loan previously.

International career
Dikmen is a youth international for Turkey, having represented the Turkey U15s and U16s.

References

External links
 
 

1997 births
Living people
Sportspeople from Samsun
Turkish footballers
Turkey youth international footballers
Samsunspor footballers
Ankara Keçiörengücü S.K. footballers
MKE Ankaragücü footballers
Altınordu F.K. players
Süper Lig players
TFF First League players
Association football defenders